The Daily Naya Diganta ( Doinik Noya Digonto) is a Bengali daily newspaper published in Bangladesh since 2004.

History
It is part of Diganta Media Corporation which was owned by Mir Quasem Ali, a Jammat-e-Islami Bangladesh politician. The television channel, Diganta TV, is a sister concern of the newspaper. The television was launched in August 2008. Alamgir Mohiuddin is the editor of Naya Diganta.

Daily Naya Diganta reporter was cautioned for misrepresenting a statement of prosecution witness in the International Crimes Tribunal in January 2012. On 17 June 2012 the chairman of the holding company Mir Quasem Ali was arrested Rapid Action Battalion on charges of war crimes during Bangladesh Liberation war. He was convicted and sentenced to death by the International Crimes Tribunal. Bangladesh Information Minister Hasanul Haq Inu accused the newspaper of carrying out "propaganda" against the International Crimes Tribunal.

A Dhaka high court indicated the editor of that paper for libel regarding the case of defaming Muhammad and another case was filled for defaming Sheikh Mujibur Rahman against Naya diganta editor. A faction of Dhaka Union of Journalists (DUJ) has expelled its units at Daily Sangram, Naya Diganta, Weekly Sonar Bangla and Diganta Television as those media houses are run by Jamaat-e-Islami and Islami Chhatra Shibir. According to the DUJ press release on 29 November 2015; it had been included that the four media houses were being run by those accused of committing crimes against humanity and the DUJ thinks keeping them as its members is not only unethical, but also against the spirit of the Bangladesh Liberation War.

Supplements
The daily has two popular weeklies named as Therapy and Abokash
Fun Magazine Therapy Editor: Ahmed Shahabuddin.
Social Magazine Abokash Editor: Maksuda Sultana.
Lifestyle Magazine Satrong Editor: Sabira Sultana.
Monthly Magazine Onno Ek Diganta Editor: Alfaz Anam

See also
 List of newspapers in Bangladesh

References

External links
 
All Bengali newspapers
 Daily's list of columnists

Publications established in 2004
Bengali-language newspapers published in Bangladesh
Daily newspapers published in Bangladesh
Newspapers published in Dhaka